Shorkan (also Romanized as Shorkān; also known as Sharakan, Shāreh Khān, Sharekān, Sheikha, and Shorakā) is a village in Sirvan Rural District, Nowsud District, Paveh County, Kermanshah Province, Iran. At the 2006 census, its population was 353, in 101 families.

References 

Populated places in Paveh County